Charles Garnier may refer to:

Charles Garnier (missionary) (1606–1649), Jesuit missionary, martyred in Canada in 1649
Charles Garnier (architect) (1825–1898), French architect
Charles Garnier (rower) (1887–1963), French Olympic rower

See also
Charlie Garner (born 1972), American football player